Huai (read Hui according to Sima Zhen) was the eighth king of the semi-legendary Xia dynasty of ancient China, who possibly ruled 44 years. His other name is Fen (芬).

Huai ascended the throne in the year of Wuzi (戊子), after his father Zhu had died.

In the 3rd year of his reign, nine barbarian(九夷)s came to his capital.

In the 16th year of his regime, the minister Luobo (洛伯) fought with minister Fengyi (冯夷) at He(河). In the 33rd year of his regime, he assigned the son of Kunwu as minister in Yousu (有苏).

He created the poem and music of Huantu(圜土) in the 36th year of his reign.

According to the Records of the Grand Historian, he ruled 26 years, but 44 years according to the Bamboo Annals.

He was succeeded by his son Mang.

Sources 

Xia dynasty kings